Muscle Shoals (2013) is an American documentary film about FAME Studios and Muscle Shoals Sound Studio in Muscle Shoals, Alabama. Directed by Greg 'Freddy' Camalier, the film was released by Magnolia Pictures on September 27, 2013. It features numerous recording artists as well as the staff and musicians associated with the studios.

Cast 
 Gregg Allman
 Bono
 Clarence Carter
 Jimmy Cliff
 Aretha Franklin (final film appearance)
 Donna Jean Godchaux
 Rick Hall
 Roger Hawkins
 David Hood
 Mick Jagger
 Etta James
 Jai Johanny Johanson
 Jimmy Johnson
 Alicia Keys
 Ed King
 Spooner Oldham
 Dan Penn 
 Keith Richards
 Percy Sledge
 Candi Staton
 John Paul White
 Steve Winwood
 Wilson Pickett

Reception 
Muscle Shoals has generally received positive reviews from critics. Katie Van Syckle of Rolling Stone remarked 
"But the documentary’s real highlights are the musings of the musicians who recorded there. Performers including Aretha Franklin, Keith Richards, Mick Jagger, Jimmy Cliff, Ed King and Steve Winwood reflect on what went into creating the magical environment and the legendary recordings that it spawned.  Artists were not only prolific in Colbert County, but their recordings were often infused with a recognizable sound Camalier describes as a "funky, soulful, propulsive kind of groove."

John DeFore of The Hollywood Reporter wrote, "The Next Must See Doc. A staple for Soul fans alongside 'Standing in the Shadows of Motown'." Film review aggregator Rotten Tomatoes reports that 97% of critics gave the film a positive review based on 69 reviews with a "Certified Fresh" rating, with an average score of 7.6/10.

Awards 
 Grand Prize, Boulder International Film Festival

References

External links 
 
 
 
 
 

2013 films
2013 documentary films
American documentary films
Documentary films about the music industry
Florence–Muscle Shoals metropolitan area
Documentary films about Alabama
2010s English-language films
2010s American films
English-language documentary films